The Captain George Flavel House Museum known also as Capt. George Flavel House and Carriage House or the Flavel Mansion, is now a house museum in Astoria, Oregon, United States. It was built in 1885 in the Queen Anne architectural style, by George Flavel, a Columbia River bar pilot who was one of the area's first millionaires.

History
The house was originally constructed in 1885 by George Flavel, a maritime pilot and entrepreneur who amassed a fortune in his business over the course of thirty years. The  house, which spans a whole city block, features Queen Anne architecture. After Flavel's death in 1893, his wife, Mary Christina, lived in the house with the couple's daughters, Nellie and Katie, until her death in 1922. Both Katie and Nelly also lived in the home until their deaths in 1910 and 1933, respectively.

The house and its carriage house were listed on the National Register of Historic Places in 1980.  The house is owned and operated by the Clatsop County Historical Society.

In popular culture
The museum is well known to fans of the film The Goonies, which was filmed in Astoria. It is featured as the museum where Mikey's father works as a curator.

Gallery

See also
Captain George Conrad Flavel House, 627 Fifteenth St., Astoria, also NRHP-listed
George C. and Winona Flavel House, 818 Grand Ave., Astoria, also NRHP-listed

Notes and references

Notes

References

Further reading

External links

Official website
Clatsop County Historical Society: Flavel House Museum

Queen Anne architecture in Oregon
Italianate architecture in Oregon
Houses completed in 1885
Museums in Astoria, Oregon
Houses on the National Register of Historic Places in Astoria, Oregon
Historic house museums in Oregon
Historical society museums in Oregon
Carriage houses in the United States
1885 establishments in Oregon
Carriage houses on the National Register of Historic Places
Transportation buildings and structures on the National Register of Historic Places in Oregon
Gilded Age mansions